Ajit Singh Pal is an Indian politician and Minister of State in the Government of Uttar Pradesh. He was member of the Uttar Pradesh Legislative Assembly from Sikandra assembly constituency of Kanpur Dehat district.

References

External links
UP: BJP retains Sikandara assembly seat in Kanpur (Times of India)

1978 births
Living people
Indian politicians
Bharatiya Janata Party politicians from Uttar Pradesh
Uttar Pradesh MLAs 2022–2027